Eddy Schurer (born 12 September 1964) is a Dutch former racing cyclist. He rode in three editions of the Tour de France.

Career achievements

Major results

1985
 1st Ronde van Overijssel
1986
 1st Stage 5b Olympia's Tour
1987
 2nd Overall Olympia's Tour
1st Stages 1, 7b (ITT) & 9
1989
 1st Grand Prix de la Libération (TTT)
 2nd Omloop van het Leiedal
 3rd Overall Ronde van Nederland
 3rd Overall Tour de Luxembourg
 4th E3 Harelbeke
1990
 4th Overall Tour de Luxembourg
1st Stage 2
 4th Kuurne–Brussels–Kuurne
 7th Overall Ronde van Nederland
1st Stage 6
 10th Overall Four Days of Dunkirk
1991
 1st Stage 4 Tour de Luxembourg
 3rd Overall Ronde van Nederland
1st Stage 5
 4th Veenendaal–Veenendaal
 9th E3 Harelbeke
1992
 1st Stage 1 Hofbrau Cup
 4th E3 Harelbeke
 9th Overall Driedaagse van De Panne-Koksijde
1993
 1st Stage 7 Four Days of Dunkirk
 3rd GP Rik Van Steenbergen
 7th Le Samyn

Grand Tour general classification results timeline

References

External links

1964 births
Living people
Dutch male cyclists
Cyclists from Friesland
People from Opsterland
20th-century Dutch people